A hydrogen maser, also known as hydrogen frequency standard, is a specific type of maser that uses the intrinsic properties of the hydrogen atom to serve as a precision frequency reference.

Both the proton and electron of a hydrogen atom have spins. The atom has a higher energy if both are spinning in the same direction, and a lower energy if they spin in opposite directions.

There are two types to be distinguished: active and passive.

In both types, a small storage bottle of molecular hydrogen, leaks a controlled amount of gas into a discharge bulb. The molecules are dissociated in the discharge bulb into individual hydrogen atoms by an electric arc. This atomic hydrogen passes through a collimator then a magnetic state selector and into a storage bulb. Adsorption onto, chemical interaction with, and perturbation of atomic state by the bulb surface is much reduced. Consistent interactions with the bulb increase the quality of the oscillation. A durable PTFE and bulb coating technology allows for over 20-year lifetime. The storage bulb is in turn inside a microwave cavity made from a precisely machined copper or silver-plated ceramic cylinder. This cavity is tuned to the  resonance frequency of the atoms. A weak static magnetic field is applied parallel to the cavity axis by a solenoid to lift the degeneracy of the magnetic Zeeman sublevels. To decrease the influence of changing external magnetic fields on the transition line frequency and be compliant to electromagnetic interferences, the cavity is surrounded by several nested layers of shields.

In the active hydrogen maser, the cavity oscillates by itself. This requires a higher hydrogen atom density and a higher quality factor for the cavity. However, with advanced microwave cavities made out of silver-plated ceramic, the gain factor can be much higher, thereby requiring less hydrogen atom density. The active maser is more complex and more expensive but has better short-term and long-term frequency stabilities.

In the passive hydrogen maser, the cavity is fed from an external  frequency. The external frequency is tuned to produce a maximum output in the cavity. This allows the use of lower hydrogen atom density and lower cavity quality factor, which reduces the cost.

See also
 Timeline of hydrogen technologies

References

Bibliography 

 

Hydrogen technologies
Laser applications
Electronics standards
Atomic clocks